Beavis and Butt-Head: Bunghole in One is a video game developed by Illusions Gaming Company and published by GT Interactive for Microsoft Windows in 1998. It is based on the MTV Beavis and Butt-Head television franchise.

Gameplay

Reception

The game received unfavorable reviews according to the review aggregation website GameRankings.

References

External links
 Official website
 

1998 video games
Golf video games
GT Interactive games
MTV video games
Video games based on Beavis and Butt-Head
Video games developed in the United States
Windows games
Windows-only games